Henriëtte Asscher (July 18, 1858 – April 9, 1933) was a Dutch painter.

Biography
Asscher was born on 18 July 1858 in Amsterdam. Her teachers included Eduard Frankfort.

She was a member of the Vereeniging Sint Lucas Amsterdam (Amsterdam Artists Association of Sint Lucas) and the Arti et Amicitiae artist's society. Her students included Charlotte Pothuis and Hendrika Van Gelder.

Asscher died on 9 April 1933, in Amsterdam.

Gallery

References

External links

1858 births
1933 deaths
Painters from Amsterdam
Dutch women painters